Edminas Bagdonas (23 October 1963 – 22 May 2021) was a Lithuanian politician and diplomat. He was the Lithuanian Ambassador to the United Arab Emirates.

Bagdonas died in Vilnius on 22 May 2021, aged 57.

References

Lithuanian politicians
Lithuanian diplomats
1963 births
2021 deaths
Diplomats from Kaunas
Ambassadors of Lithuania to Italy
Ambassadors of Lithuania to Belarus
Ambassadors of Lithuania to Israel
Ambassadors of Lithuania to the United Arab Emirates